Xanthophyllum tenue is a tree in the family Polygalaceae. The specific epithet  is from the Latin meaning "slender", referring to the twigs.

Description
The smooth bark is greyish or pale brown. The flowers are yellowish or white, drying orange.

Distribution and habitat
Xanthophyllum tenue is endemic to Borneo. Its habitat is mixed dipterocarp and lower montane forests from sea-level to  altitude.

References

tenue
Endemic flora of Borneo
Trees of Borneo
Plants described in 1929